NEDD4 family-interacting protein 2 is a protein that in humans is encoded by the NDFIP2 gene.

Interactions
NDFIP2 has been shown to interact with NEDD4.

References

Further reading

Human proteins